Beowulf: The Game is a hack and slash video game for Microsoft Windows, PlayStation 3, PlayStation Portable and Xbox 360. It is based upon the 2007 film Beowulf. It was released on November 13, 2007 in the United States. The characters are voiced by the original actors who starred in the film.

Plot
The story begins with Beowulf racing on a beach with a fellow Thane. On the beach they slay crabs and then Beowulf races with the Thane in the sea, where he is attacked by a sea serpent. He fights the serpent on a small rock structure but is defeated and thrown into the water; there, Grendel's mother appears and says he is her new hero, and grants him power. Beowulf defeats the sea serpent with his newfound power and returns to the beach where he was racing with the Thane.

Afterward, having heard the problem the Danes are facing, he goes to help King Hrothgar to stop Grendel, gaining Heroic powers on the journey. Afterwards, the player plays through the thirty years of Beowulf's life as king of the Danes, which was not seen in the movie. Beowulf gets to journey from Herot to Iceland, defeating demons and large creatures, from a giant hellhound to trolls.

Reception

The game was met with very mixed reception.  GameRankings and Metacritic gave it a score of 55% and 51 out of 100 for the PlayStation 3 version; 54% and 51 out of 100 for the Xbox 360 version; 48% and 44 out of 100 for the PSP version; and 45% and 44 out of 100 for the PC version.

References

External links
 

2007 video games
Ubisoft games
PlayStation 3 games
PlayStation Portable games
Video games based on films
Video games based on Norse mythology
Video games developed in China
Video games scored by Cris Velasco
Video games scored by Sascha Dikiciyan
Video games set in Denmark
Windows games
Xbox 360 games
Works based on Beowulf